Dulal Lahiri is an Indian actor and director. He has appeared in numerous Bengali films and TV series. He was critically appreciated for his Cinemawalla (1993) a Bengali TV series starring Rituparna Sengupta. He introduced Sreelekha Mitra in his directorial venture Balikar Prem.

Filmography

Television

Awards

References

External links 
 

Bengali male television actors
Living people
20th-century Indian male actors
21st-century Indian male actors
1947 births
Scottish Church Collegiate School alumni
Bengali actors